Mozley is a surname. Notable people with the surname include: 

Bert Mozley (born 1923), English footballer
Charles Mozley (1914–1991), English artist
Fiona Mozley (born 1988), English novelist
James Bowling Mozley (1813–1878), English theologian
John Mozley (1883–1946), English Anglican priest, theologian, and academic
J. F. Mozley (1887–1974), British Anglican priest and historian
Loren Mozley (1905-1989), American painter and art professor
Norman Adolphus Mozley (1865–1922), American congressman
Thomas Mozley (1806–1893), English clergyman

See also
Moseley (surname)
Mosely, surname
Mosley (surname)

English toponymic surnames